Kaf Miyas  is a suburb of Bayda. It is located about 2 km south of Bayda.

References

External links
Satellite map at Maplandia.com

Basic People's Congress divisions of Bayda
Populated places in Jabal al Akhdar